Cyclophora hirtipalpis is a moth in the  family Geometridae. It is found on Borneo.

The wings are uniform pale dull red with a large, pale yellow discal spot on the hindwing.

References

Moths described in 1932
Cyclophora (moth)
Moths of Borneo